Bögholmen is a village in the commune of Laholm, Sweden.

External links
Tourist agency of Laholm(English)

Populated places in Halland County
Populated places in Laholm Municipality